Rolando Vargas is the head tennis coach for the Troy Trojans men's tennis team.  He was previously the head coach of the Radford Highlanders men's tennis team in 2018, as well the head coach for the AUM Warhawks men's and women's tennis teams.

Vargas is a graduate of Troy University and former player for the Trojans.  He played professionally after graduating from college, achieving a career-high ATP ranking of 839.

On May 13, 2022, he was named USPTA Southern College Coach of the Year.

In 2022, Vargas led Troy to its second straight appearance in the Sun Belt Conference Tournament semifinals, 16 victories and a win over No. 48 Louisiana this past season. In addition to the ranked win, the Trojans almost pulled off another stunner at No. 24 Florida State before losing to the Seminoles, 4-3, after a pair of three-set matches didn't go Troy's way. Troy finished ranked 9 in the Southern region which is their third straight appearance in the last year end rankings. 

In 2021, he led the Troy Trojans to a Conference high 20-4 record finishing with a 8 ranking in the Southern region and as high as 60 nationally. 

Although the 2019-20 season was cut short due to the COVID-19 pandemic, Vargas' squad continued to show improvement. Under Vargas' leadership, the Trojans posted an 11-4 overall record and ended the season on a six-match winning streak. 

In his first season in 2018-19, he guided his squad to 17 wins, the most since the program won 25 during the 2014-15 season. Troy also finished ranked 9 in the region.

Vargas spent one season as the head coach at Radford, where he led the Highlanders to a four-win improvement from the year prior.

While Vargas was head coach of both men's and women's teams at AUM in 2017, he led both programs to national and regional rankings. After playing their first full NCAA Division II schedule, the men finished the season ranked 7th in the highly-competitive South Region and 13th in the Nation. At the same time, the women were 5th and 19th respectively. The men’s highlight win was when they visited No. 4 Armstrong State University.

Previously, he took his teams to the NAIA National Tournament every season finishing fifth-place or better every year with both programs. The highlight while coaching the men's team was leading them to the NAIA Finals. He was named USPTA Southern and National Coach of the year in 2015 . Likewise, Vargas was able to lead the women's team to four NAIA national championships (in bold) and finished with a career record of 150-35 (27-5, 26-2, 17-8, 19-8, 23-4, 21-4, and 17-4). 

Vargas coached 58 NAIA All-Americans, 30 ITA All-Americans and 10 conference players of the year.

In 2013, his teams were ranked 1 in the Nation throughout the season and finished 1 in singles and doubles with both men’s and women’s. Furthermore, several of his players finished in the ITA All-Star team (best players in the nation in all Divisions) in four different years as the top ranked player at the end of the year automatically earned the prestigious honor. 

In 2011, he won his first National Championship with only five players on the roster for the entire season. 

The men’s received the 2010-11 Buffalo Funds Champions of Character Team Award. The accolade, one of 23 given out by the National Association of Intercollegiate Athletics for each of its 23 championship sports, honors the one team in each sport that demonstrates in every day decisions respect, responsibility, integrity, servant leadership and sportsmanship. 

He is a certified USPTA Elite Professional and has been a member since 2009.

Head men’s coaching record

References

Year of birth missing (living people)
Living people
American tennis coaches
Auburn Montgomery Warhawks
College tennis coaches in the United States
Radford Highlanders coaches
Troy Trojans